The James Iredell House is a historic home located at Edenton, Chowan County, North Carolina. The original section was built 1800, and expanded to its present configuration about 1827. It is a two-story, "L"-shaped frame dwelling with Georgian and Federal style design elements. It was the home of James Iredell, an ardent patriot and Justice of the Supreme Court.

It was listed on the National Register of Historic Places in 1970.

The house is now a historic house museum, one of several sites of Historic Edenton, and belongs to the North Carolina Department of Natural and Cultural resources. Other historic sites open for tour include the Roanoke River Light, Chowan County Courthouse, Barker House, Cupola House and St. Paul's Episcopal Church.

References

External links

 Historic Edenton

Historic American Buildings Survey in North Carolina
Houses on the National Register of Historic Places in North Carolina
Georgian architecture in North Carolina
Federal architecture in North Carolina
Houses completed in 1759
Houses in Chowan County, North Carolina
National Register of Historic Places in Chowan County, North Carolina
Museums in Chowan County, North Carolina
Historic house museums in North Carolina
Former state parks of North Carolina